NASCAR Racing 1999 Edition is a racing simulator developed by Papyrus Design Group and published by Sierra On-Line in 1998 for Microsoft Windows. Players can race in all three premier NASCAR series (NASCAR Winston Cup Series, NASCAR Busch Series, and NASCAR Craftsman Truck Series). There is a maximum of 39 cars to race in each series.

Reception 

The game received mixed reviews from critics.

References

External links 
 

1998 video games
Multiplayer and single-player video games
NASCAR video games
Papyrus Design Group games
Racing simulators
Racing video games
Sierra Entertainment games
Video games developed in the United States
Windows games
Windows-only games